The New Zealand Sevens is an annual rugby sevens tournament currently held at Waikato Stadium in Hamilton, New Zealand. For the first eighteen years of its history the event was held in Wellington. The event is the third on the World Rugby Sevens Series circuit and is generally held in late January or early February.

History

Wellington
Wellington first hosted a tournament in 2000 as part of the inaugural Sevens World Series. The event was the first to be held in the newly-developed Westpac Stadium. The tournament built a reputation for a party atmosphere, with a large proportion of attendees choosing to wear fancy dress. Movie figures such as the Men in Black (MIB) and Austin Powers were crowd favorites and an impersonator of Austin Powers was a regular for many years performing for the crowd. Host team New Zealand dominated the sevens competition in Wellington, winning just over half of all the tournaments held.

Hamilton
The location of the tournament was moved to Hamilton in 2018, after attendances in Wellington had declined. The tournament was hosted as part of an integrated men's and women's event from 2019. Discussion was also begun on alternating the host location of the tournament between Hamilton and Suva, in Fiji, following the 2020 edition.

Results

See also
 New Zealand Women's Sevens

References

External links 
New Zealand Sevens official site

 
Recurring sporting events established in 2000
World Rugby Sevens Series tournaments
International rugby union competitions hosted by New Zealand
Rugby sevens competitions in New Zealand
2000 establishments in New Zealand